It's My Love Story is a 2011 Indian Telugu-language romantic drama film directed by Madhura Sreedhar Reddy and starring Arvind Krishna (in his lead debut) and newcomer Nikitha Narayan. Author Chetan Bhagat attended the film's premiere. The film released to negative reviews while the songs were praised.

Cast 
Arvind Krishna as Arjun
Nikitha Narayan as Vandana 
Jayasudha as Lakshmi, Vandana's mother
Sarath Babu as Srinivasa Rao, Vandana's father
Pragathi as Arjun's mother
Kasi Vishwanath as Arjun's father
Vennela Kishore as Sujath A., Vandana's gay boss
RJ Ghajini as Peter
Thagubothu Ramesh as Poola Babji, the drunk flower seller
Sundeep Kishan and Shifa Aqil (cameo appearance in the song "Gallate")

Soundtrack
Songs by Sunil Kashyap. Songs were released on Madhura Audio.
"Gallate" – Pranavi, Sunil Kashyap
"Muppai Sekanley" – Hemachandra, Sunil Kashyap, Pranavi, Nikitha Nigam
"Neeloni Digule" – Pranavi
"Nindaina Nee Chelimi" – Karunya, Pranavi
"Ninnala Lede" – Chitra, Dinker
"Thadi Pedavule Kalis" – Karunya, Chitra

Reception 
A critic from The Times of India wrote that "The plot is uninteresting and the actors are too inexperienced to rise above it. Innovative screen play could have still salvaged the film, but that doesn’t happen either". Radhika Rajamani of Rediff.com opined that "It's My Love Story is a disappointing film with nothing to engage the audience". Y. Sunitha Chowdhary of The Hindu wrote that "The story could have been simple and straight [...] but the plot turns labyrinthine with the sudden change in behaviour and character of Sarat Babu". A critic from 123Telugu wrote that "‘Its My Love Story’ is one of those movies which fails to connect even though nothing is technically very wrong with the movie". Deepa Garimella of Full Hyderabad said that "It's My Love Story is an imperfect film, but delightful for the promise it shows".

Awards and nominations 
South Indian International Movie Awards
Best Male Debut – Telugu - Aravind Krishna - Nominated
Best Female Debut – Telugu - Nikitha Narayan - Nominated

References

External links